In mathematics, a quantum affine algebra (or affine quantum group) is a Hopf algebra that is a q-deformation of the universal enveloping algebra of an affine Lie algebra. One of their principal applications has been to the theory of solvable lattice models in quantum statistical mechanics, where the Yang–Baxter equation occurs with a spectral parameter. Combinatorial aspects of the representation theory of quantum affine algebras can be described simply using crystal bases, which correspond to the degenerate case when the deformation parameter q vanishes and the Hamiltonian of the associated lattice model can be explicitly diagonalized.

See also
Quantum enveloping algebra
Quantum KZ equations
Littelmann path model
Yangian

References

Quantum groups
Representation theory
Exactly solvable models
Mathematical quantization